Luis Iriondo (15 December 1952 – 6 May 2005) was a Bolivian footballer. He played in four matches for the Bolivia national football team from 1973 to 1975. He was also part of Bolivia's squad for the 1975 Copa América tournament.

References

1952 births
2005 deaths
Bolivian footballers
Bolivia international footballers
Place of birth missing
Association football midfielders
The Strongest players